Aliabad-e Bar Anazar (also Romanized as ‘Alīābād-e Bar Ānāzār; also known as Kāz̧emābād and Kāz̧emābād-e Sūrcham) is a village in Qalayi Rural District, Firuzabad District, Selseleh County, Lorestan Province, Iran. At the 2006 census, its population was 42, in 11 families.

References 

Towns and villages in Selseleh County